The Broye  is a 68 km long river, in the cantons of Fribourg and Vaud, in Switzerland. It has a watershed area of 850 km².

Presentation
Its source is located in Semsales, in the Fribourgeois/Vaudois Prealps, south-west of Bulle. It flows first south-west along the Fribourgeois/Vaudois Prealps and turns north after 10 km. The direction of the river changes again near Moudon to the north-east. From Payerne, the Broye is running in a large and agricultural valley. The river flows into Lake Morat first, and then into Lake Neuchâtel through the Broye canal (French: Canal de la Broye).

List of Tributaries
 The Petite Glâne
 The Bressonne
 The Lembe
 The Arbogne

Course
Semsales
Oron
Moudon
Lucens
Payerne
Salavaux
Lake Morat
Sugiez
La Sauge
Lake Neuchatel

See also

Swiss plateau
Jura water correction

References

External links
Tourisme
Portail Internet de la Broye vaudoise et fribourgeoise

Rivers of Switzerland
Tributaries of Lake Neuchâtel
Rivers of the canton of Vaud
Rivers of the canton of Fribourg